Torrone "T. Y." McGill Jr. (born November 23, 1992) is an American football nose tackle for the San Francisco 49ers of the National Football League (NFL). He played college football at NC State and signed with the Seattle Seahawks as an undrafted free agent in 2015. McGill has since been a member of several other NFL teams.

High school and college career
McGill was captain of both the football and basketball teams at Wayne County High School, and was an all-region selection after his junior and senior seasons. In 2010, he was selected to play in the 2010 Georgia North/South All-Star game and was recruited during his senior year by North Carolina State.

McGill was a starter in his freshman year at NC State, and finished his career with 120 total tackles and 10 sacks. McGill was suspended for two games in his senior year for undisclosed disciplinary reasons.

Professional career
McGill did not receive an invite to the 2015 NFL Combine, but did participate in a Pro Day at NC State.

Seattle Seahawks
McGill was signed as a free agent by the Seattle Seahawks on May 15, 2015, after attending their mini-camp on a try out basis. He was signed to the 90-man roster, and impressed early on, with Head Coach Pete Carroll claiming "All the way through all of our workouts, he’s been impressive.", and he was projected to make the final 53-man roster. McGill was waived by the Seahawks on September 5, 2015.

Indianapolis Colts
McGill was claimed from waivers by the Indianapolis Colts on September 6, 2015.

On September 2, 2017, McGill was waived during the final cuts.

Cleveland Browns
On September 3, 2017, McGill was claimed off waivers by the Cleveland Browns. He was waived by the Browns on December 13, 2017 and re-signed to the practice squad.

Kansas City Chiefs
On January 15, 2018, McGill signed a reserve/future contract with the Kansas City Chiefs. He was waived on September 1, 2018.

Los Angeles Chargers
On September 2, 2018, McGill was claimed off waivers by the Los Angeles Chargers. He was waived on October 6, 2018.

Philadelphia Eagles 
On October 8, 2018, McGill was claimed off waivers by the Philadelphia Eagles, but was waived two days later after failing his physical. He was re-signed by the Eagles on November 6, 2018. He was waived on November 20, 2018.

Los Angeles Chargers (second stint)
On November 21, 2018, McGill was claimed off waivers by the Los Angeles Chargers. He was waived on August 31, 2019.

Washington Redskins
McGill signed with the Washington Redskins on September 10, 2019. He was released on September 24, 2019.

Los Angeles Chargers (third stint)
On October 17, 2019, McGill was signed by the Los Angeles Chargers. He was released on November 30, 2019.

New Orleans Saints
On December 11, 2019, McGill was signed by the New Orleans Saints. He was released on December 16.

Philadelphia Eagles (second stint)
On August 26, 2020, McGill was signed by the Philadelphia Eagles. He was waived on September 4, 2020. On September 9, he was re-signed to the Eagles practice squad. He was elevated to the active roster on September 12, October 22, November 14, November 21, and November 30 for the team's weeks 1, 7, 10, 11, and 12 games against the Washington Football Team, New York Giants twice, Cleveland Browns, and Seattle Seahawks, and reverted to the practice squad after each game. He was signed to the active roster on December 26, 2020. He signed a one-year contract extension with the Eagles on January 4, 2021. McGill was released by the Eagles on September 13, 2021.

Washington Football Team
On September 28, 2021, McGill was signed to the Washington Football Team's practice squad. He was released on November 1, 2021.

Minnesota Vikings
On November 9, 2021, McGill was signed to the Minnesota Vikings practice squad. He was re-signed on March 9, 2022. He was placed on injured reserve on August 29, 2022. He was released on September 6.

San Francisco 49ers
On October 11, 2022, McGill was signed to the San Francisco 49ers practice squad. He was promoted to the active roster on November 26.

On March 17, 2023, McGill re-signed with the 49ers.

References

1992 births
Living people
Players of American football from Georgia (U.S. state)
American football defensive tackles
American football defensive ends
NC State Wolfpack football players
People from Jesup, Georgia
Seattle Seahawks players
Indianapolis Colts players
Cleveland Browns players
Kansas City Chiefs players
Los Angeles Chargers players
Philadelphia Eagles players
Washington Redskins players
Washington Football Team players
New Orleans Saints players
Minnesota Vikings players
San Francisco 49ers players
People from Georgia (U.S. state)